Ghost Machine is a five-piece music group from the United States.

Ghost Machine may also refer to:

 Ghost Machine (album), the self-titled debut album by the five-piece music group Ghost Machine.
 Ghost Machine (film), a British mystery thriller released in 2009.
 "Ghost Machine" (Torchwood), an episode of the British science fiction television series Torchwood.

See also 

 Ghost in the machine (disambiguation)